Futian Bonded Area station is the terminal station on Line 3 of the Shenzhen Metro. It opened on 28 October 2020.

Station layout

Exits

References

Shenzhen Metro stations
Railway stations in Guangdong
Futian District
Railway stations in China opened in 2020